The Pyjama Girl Murder Case is a dramatised 1939 documentary film from director Rupert Kathner based on the murder of Linda Agostini.

It was an installment of the Australia Today series and was Australia's first "true crime" movie.

References

External links
Australia Today - Pyjama Girl at Australian Screen Online
The Pyjama Girl Murder at Rewind (ABC TV)

Crime films based on actual events
1939 films
1939 crime drama films
Australian documentary films
1939 documentary films
Australian crime drama films